Live at Bonnaroo is the third album and second live album by Warren Haynes and was recorded at the Bonnaroo Music Festival on June 15, 2003. It is Warren Haynes' third release as a solo artist.

Track listing
"Lucky" (C. Greenwood, J. Greenwood, Selway, Yorke) - 4:22
"Patchwork Quilt" (Haynes) - 4:23
"To Lay Me Down" (Garcia, Hunter) - 4:52
"Glory Road" (Sisk) - 4:59
"The Real Thing" (Haynes) - 5:54
"One" (Bono) - 5:23
"In My Life" (Haynes) - 4:19
"I'll Be The One" (Haynes) - 5:03
"Fallen Down" (Haynes) - 5:25
"Forevermore" (Haynes) - 3:39
"Beautifully Broken" (Haynes, Louis) - 3:34
"I've Got Dreams To Remember" (O. Redding, Z. Redding, Rock) - 4:25
"Tastes Like Wine" (Haynes) - 4:39
"Wasted Time" (Henley, Frey) - 4:53
"Stella Blue" (Garcia, Hunter) - 6:19 
"Soulshine" (Haynes) - 6:42, with Vusi Mahlasela

References

2004 live albums
Warren Haynes albums